Edward Lowery Woodruff (October 8, 1851 – April 1, 1943) was born in Buffalo, New York on October and attended Columbia College, Washington, D.C. and Columbia University, New York, NY.  He began his career as a civil engineer in the U.S. Lighthouse Service.  Distinguishing himself early in his career as an award-winning lighthouse designer, he received a Phebe Hobson Fowler Architectural Award for his design of Angel's Gate Light in Los Angeles.

Woodruff started a private architectural practice in Staten Island and became a sought after specialist in country homes in Massachusetts, New Jersey, and Vermont.  He designed two early developments and several estates in Sea Bright and Rumson.

His great grandfather Aaron Woodruff had been attorney general of New Jersey.

Selected works
Angel's Gate Light
Blithewald Rumson, NJ
Race Rock Light
Stratford Shoal Light
Stepping Stones Light

References

Architects from New York (state)
Architects from New York City
19th-century American architects
20th-century American architects
1851 births
1943 deaths